The Southern Aid Society Building–Dunbar Theater is an historic structure located in the Shaw neighborhood of Washington, D.C.  The building was designed by architect Isaiah T. Hatton. Reginald W. Geare designed the theater portion of the building.  It was completed in 1921.  It has been listed on the District of Columbia Inventory of Historic Sites since 1984 and it was listed on the National Register of Historic Places in 1986.  It is a contributing property in the Greater U Street Historic District.

See also
 Southern Aid and Insurance Company

References

Office buildings completed in 1921
1921 establishments in Washington, D.C.
Theatres on the National Register of Historic Places in Washington, D.C.
Office buildings on the National Register of Historic Places in Washington, D.C.
African-American history of Washington, D.C.
Theatres completed in 1921
Individually listed contributing properties to historic districts on the National Register in Washington, D.C.
Shaw (Washington, D.C.)